Salem Al Ketbi is an Emirati political analyst, researcher and opinion writer. Al Ketbi has a Ph.D. in Public Law and Political Science from the Hassan II University, Casablanca, for his thesis titled "Political and religious propaganda and leadership through the social media in the Arab World" (Al-Diayah wa al-Qiyadah al-Siyasiah wa al-Diniyah Abra Shabakat al-Tawasul al-Ijtimai fi al-Mintaqah al-Arabiyah).

Journalism 
Al Ketbi has written for newspapers and media outlets including Gulf News, The Jerusalem Post, Israel Hayom, Israel National News, Al Arabiya, the London-based Al-Arab, Morocco's L'Opinion, Libération, L'Économiste, Al-Alam, Maroc Hebdo, Hespress and Article19, Sada El Balad in English and Arabic, Med Israel for fred, MEMRI, Arab News, as well as some research centers. He also writes on UAE national security, Iranian foreign policy, terrorist organizations and extremist groups.

His posts on AgoraVox in French are often featured in the 100 Trends.

In the context of the 2020 Abraham Accord, according to La Repubblica Al Ketbi said the UAE was using its role to neutralize the escalation of violence that could have resulted from an "Israeli annexation of Palestinian land", re-introduce the possibility of a political solution and revive the peace process.

Works
Al Ketbi published a historical-analytical research paper in Arabic titled "Dawlat al-Imarat al-Arabiya al-Muttahidah wa al-Qadiyyah al-Filistiniyah Dirasah Tarikhiyah" ("The UAE and the Palestinian Issue: A Historical Study) on the political strategy of the UAE in relation to the Palestinian issue since 1971.

He argues Emirati support for the Palestinians focuses mainly on the development and infrastructure sectors. He also provides cases of financial and political support.

In 2017, Al Ketbi published Fakhr al-Oroba: Sheikh Mohammed bin Zayed Al Nahyan, al-Qaid wal-Insan (The Pride of Arabs Mohammed bin Zayed Al Nahyan, the leader and the man), a political biography of Emir Mohammed bin Zayed.
In 2017, Al Ketbi won the Arab Women Media Network (AWMN) award for Book of the Year for the book.

Views 
Speaking to US Arabic-language television channel Al Hurra, Al Ketbi cited the "weakness" of post-revolutionary Arab countries as a factor in the growing Iranian influence in the Middle East and its "control of four Arab capitals", which Al Ketbi stated in several articles.

Memberships 
Al Ketbi is member of Chatham House, IAPC's London Press Club, Press Club Brussels, International Federation of Journalists, Federation Of Arab Journalists and UAE Journalists Association.

Events 
Al Ketbi spoke at the 2017 MEDays annual international forum on issues of think tanks and soft power in the Middle East and Africa.

FNC election 
In 2019, Al Ketbi ran in the Federal National Council election on a platform of education, women and youth empowerment.

See also
 Foreign relations of the United Arab Emirates
 Terrorism and social media
 Nadia Hijab

References

External links
  Official website

Emirati political scientists
Emirati academics